The 1974–75 OB I bajnokság season was the 38th season of the OB I bajnokság, the top level of ice hockey in Hungary. Four teams participated in the league, and Ferencvarosi TC won the championship.

Regular season

External links
 Spielzeit bei hockeyarchives.info

Hun
OB I bajnoksag seasons
1974–75 in Hungarian ice hockey